The following is a list of notable events and releases that happened in 2018, in music in Australia.

Events

January

February

March
24 March – Download Festival is held in Australia for the first time at Flemington Racecourse in Melbourne. The inaugural festival is headlined by Korn, Prophets of Rage, NOFX and Arch Enemy.

April

May
 12 May – Australia's representative in the Eurovision Song Contest 2018, Jessica Mauboy, finishes in 20th place with 99 points for the song "We Got Love".

June

July
20–22 July – Splendour in the Grass 2018 is held at North Byron Parklands in Yelgun, New South Wales, headlined by Kendrick Lamar, Lorde and Vampire Weekend.

August

September

October

November

December

Bands disbanded

Album and Single releases

Albums

Singles

Deaths

6 March - Jeff St John, 71, singer
24 April - Paul Gray, 54, musician, songwriter, singer
24 May - Phil Emmanuel, 65, musician
2 September - Conway Savage, 58, musician, singer-songwriter, composer
2 October - Michael Weiley, 59, musician

See also
Australia in the Eurovision Song Contest 2018
List of number-one singles of 2018 (Australia)
List of number-one albums of 2018 (Australia)

References

 
Australian
Australian music